Arhopala kiriwinii  is a butterfly in the family Lycaenidae. It was described by George Thomas Bethune-Baker in 1903. It is found in the Australasian realm (Trobriand Island, Fergusson Island, Woodlar Island, and New Guinea).

References

External links
Arhopala Boisduval, 1832 at Markku Savela's Lepidoptera and Some Other Life Forms. Retrieved June 3, 2017.

Arhopala
Butterflies described in 1903